Colonial Institute may refer to:

 The Colonial Institute, Brussels, Belgium
 The Royal Colonial Institute in London, England, now known as the Royal Commonwealth Society
 The Royal Tropical Institute in Amsterdam, the Netherlands, originally called the Colonial Institute
 The University of Hamburg, formerly the Colonial Institute (Kolonialinstitut)